Krystal LaPorte  is an American voice actress and lawyer, best known for her voicework on anime dubs for Sentai Filmworks and Funimation.

Early life and career
LaPorte was raised in a suburb of Chicago, where from a young age she was active in local theater; and became interested in poetry and music. She intended to take a theater program with the aim of a career as an opera singer, instead taking the path to become an attorney. She graduated with a Bachelor of Science in Philosophy, Political Science and Psychology from the University of Illinois Urbana-Champaign, and went on to study at the University of Houston Law Center. During her three years in law school, she pursued a voice acting career, after studying acting theory and improv in her free time during her Bachelor's program. Since passing the bar, LaPorte primarily works as a criminal defense attorney, with voice acting sessions occupying her evenings.

Personal life
LaPorte initially met Christopher Ayres through voice acting in anime, but credited their bond to a variety of common interests. LaPorte and Ayres were in a relationship for nine years, until his death in 2021.

Filmography

Anime series

Film

Animation

References

External links

21st-century American actresses
American voice actresses
Living people
University of Houston Law Center alumni
Year of birth missing (living people)